The 1970 Memphis State Tigers football team represented Memphis State University (now known as the University of Memphis) as an independent during the 1970 NCAA University Division football season. In its 13th season under head coach Billy J. Murphy, the team compiled a 6–4 record (2–2 against conference opponents), finished in third place out of five teams in the MVC, and outscored opponents by a total of 227 to 184. The team played its home games at Memphis Memorial Stadium in Memphis, Tennessee. 

The team's statistical leaders included Rick Strawbridge with 557 passing yards, Paul Gowen with 868 rushing yards, Bill Wright with 206 receiving yards, and Jay McCoy with 54 points scored.

Schedule

References

Memphis State
Memphis Tigers football seasons
Memphis State Tigers football